This is a list of defunct airlines of Belarus.

See also
 List of airlines of Belarus
 List of airports in Belarus

References

Belarus
Airlines
Airlines, defunct